A sleepover is a party where guests are invited to stay overnight.

Sleepover(s) or Sleep Over may also refer to:

 Sleepover (film), a 2004 film
 "Sleepover", a Malcolm in the Middle episode
 "Sleepover", a That '70s Show episode
 "Sleepover", a song by Hayley Kiyoko from Expectations
 Sleepovers (book), a 2001 book by Jacqueline Wilson 
 SleepOver, a 2011 album by Canadian producer Socalled
 "Sleep Over", an episode of the television series Teletubbies
Sleep ∞ Over, an American indie rock group
The Sleepover, a 2020 film